Madame Bovary is a 1991 French drama film directed by Claude Chabrol and based on the 1857 novel Madame Bovary by French author Gustave Flaubert.

Set in Normandy in the 1850s, the film follows the story of Emma Bovary, an attractive young woman full of romantic notions, whose marriage to an unexciting country doctor leads her to adulterous affairs, debts and eventual suicide.

Plot
Facing spinsterhood on her widowed father's farm Emma, with the help of her father, is successful in attracting and contracting a marriage with the local doctor, whose wife has recently died. Charles Bovary is kindly and conscientious, but lacks assertiveness and is a dull conversationalist. Following an aristocratic ball she is more dissatisfied than ever and her husband, noticing this, moves to a larger town with potentially greater diversions, where he is befriended by the apothecary.

There she meets the law clerk Léon, with whom she can talk about art, literature, poetry and music. His attentions to her cause adverse comment and eventually prompt her to instead become more attentive to her husband and baby, but this leads her to become dissatisfied yet again. The parish priest is a poor listener and does not respond to her unhappiness. Léon, disappointed by her rejection, leaves to study in Paris, leaving her without congenial company.

After encountering her, the womanising landowner Rodolphe decides he would like an affair with her and, under the pretence of offering riding lessons, finds her more than willing. 
After four years, she demands that they run away together and, after he agrees, buys travelling clothes and luggage on credit; instead he writes her a farewell letter and leaves town.

She is in despair, until she discovers that Léon has found a job in the city of Rouen nearby. Under the pretence of having piano lessons, she takes the regular coach to Rouen and meets him in a hotel. To pay the cost of the coach fares, the hotel room, smart clothes to go to town and gifts to Léon, together with extravagant furnishings, she runs up debts with the conniving shopkeeper Lheureux. When he demands repayment, neither of her lovers will help and she cannot face the truth coming out. Bailiffs seize the contents of the house, which is put up for sale by court order, and a lawyer she consults wants sex in return for his help, which she rejects. After taking poison, she dies in prolonged agony. Her husband, devastated when he learns all that has happened, dies of grief. Their child ends up with a penniless aunt, who puts her to work in a factory.

Cast
 Isabelle Huppert as Emma Bovary
 Jean-François Balmer as Charles Bovary
 Christophe Malavoy as Rodolphe Boulanger, the landowner
 Jean Yanne as Homais, the pharmacist
 Lucas Belvaux as Léon Dupuis, the law student
 Christiane Minazzoli as the widow Lefrançois
 Jean-Louis Maury as Lheureux, the shopkeeper
 Florent Gibassier as Hippolyte, the stable lad
 Jean-Claude Bouillaud as Rouault, Emma's father
 Sabeline Campo as Félicité, the maid
 Marie Mergey as Charles Bovary's mother
 François Maistre as Lieuvain, the lawyer
 Thomas Chabrol as the Viscount
 Jacques Dynam as Father Bournisien
 Henri Attal as Maître Hareng, the bailiff
 Dominique Zardi as the blind man
 Louis-Do de Lencquesaing

Reception
On Rotten Tomatoes, the film holds a rating of 67% from 15 reviews.

It was nominated for the Golden Globe Award for Best Foreign Language Film as well as for the Academy Award for Best Costume Design. It was also entered into the 17th Moscow International Film Festival where Isabelle Huppert won the award for Best Actress.

See also
 Isabelle Huppert on screen and stage
 French films of 1991

References

External links
 
 
 
 
 

1991 films
1991 drama films
Adultery in films
Films about infidelity
1990s French-language films
Films based on Madame Bovary
Films directed by Claude Chabrol
Films produced by Marin Karmitz
Films set in the 19th century
The Samuel Goldwyn Company films
French drama films
1990s French films